Bharaas is a Pakistani television family drama aired on ARY Digital from 28 September 2020 to 4 February 2021. It is produced by Humayun Saeed and Shahzad Nasib under Six Sigma Plus. It stars Omar Shehzad, Dur-e-Fishan Saleem, Furqan Qureshi and Zubab Rana in lead roles. Bharaas is the story of couple Zoya (Dur-e-Fishan Saleem) and Hassan (Omar Shahzad) who love each other and gets married but their envious cousins Kamal (Furqan Qureshi) and Kiran (Zubab Rana) wants to destroy their relationship.

Cast
Omar Shahzad as Hassan (Main male protagonist)
Dur-e-Fishan Saleem as Zoya (Main female protagonist)
Zubab Rana as Kiran (antagonist)
Furqan Qureshi as Kamal (antagonist)
Salman Saeed as Mansoor; Hassan's elder brother, residing in Canada
Behroze Sabzwari as Javed; Mansoor and Hassan's father  
Shaista Jabeen as Fazeela; Mansoor and Hassan's mother
Shaheen Khan as Almas; Kiran's mother and Javed's sister
Rabya Kulsoom as Sasha; Zoya's younger sister
Khaled Anam as Mubarak Ali (Abbi); Zoya and Sasha father
Shazia Qaiser as Mumtaz; Kamaal's mother and Mubarak's sister
Musaddiq Malik as Taimoor; Sasha's boyfriend
Tara Mahmood; Taimoor's step mother
Syeda Tuba Anwar as Mina; Zoya's friend
Noreen Mumtaz as Mahira;Taimoor's step sister
Imam Syed as Jamal; Taimoor's father 
Atabik Mohsin as Ramzi; male nurse hired for Javed by Zoya
Naeem Malik as Adeel; police officer who arrests Kamaal
Sohail Masood as Shakeel; Mubarak's friend
Kaiser Rafik
Sheraz Dilawar

Reception
The serial received positive reviews from the audience for its intriguing storyline. Fishan's portrayal as Zoya received praise for her performance. Also Rana and Qureshi portrayals as antagonist were well received by the viewer's. It also grabbed good trp's throughout its run.

Awards and nominations

References

ARY Digital original programming
Pakistani television series
2020 Pakistani television series debuts
2021 Pakistani television series endings